Calhoun School, The Way to a Better Future is a 1940 black and white documentary film that features the now-defunct Calhoun Colored School in Calhoun, Alabama, Lowndes County, Alabama. Directed and filmed by Kenneth F. Space and produced by the Harmon Foundation, the film displays impoverished communities in Alabama and the role the Calhoun Colored School played building rural infrastructure and African American healthcare in rural Alabama. The film is held in the National Archive as part of the Harmon Foundation Collection and its "Negro Schools for American Living" series.

Plot
The film show scenes impoverished areas of Lowndes County, Alabama, namely, the "Big Swamp" area. The film then highlights the Calhoun Colored School and its mission to improve outcomes for African American children. The film also show numerous scenes of African American adults and children going about their daily life, including school principal, Dr. Jerome F Kidder. The film concludes with African American children marching and performing a flag ceremony.

Cast and Crew

 Kenneth F. Space, Director and Cinematographer
 Jerome F Kidder, Principal of the Calhoun Colored School as himself

References

1940 documentary films
Documentary films about African Americans
Documentary films about Alabama
1940 short films
American documentary films
1940s American films